Harold Ellis (born October 7, 1970) is a retired American professional basketball player. A 6'5" (1.96 m) shooting guard from Morehouse College, Ellis was never drafted by a National Basketball Association team but did manage to play in 3 NBA seasons.

Professional career
Following a two-season stint with the Quad City Thunder of the Continental Basketball Association, Ellis played for the Los Angeles Clippers from 1993 to 1995. He then moved to Europe and the Greek Basket League to play for Aris during the 1995–96 season, and Apollon Patras during the 1996–97 season. He then returned to the NBA to play for the Denver Nuggets during the 1997–98 season.

In his NBA career, Ellis played in 145 games and scored a total of 840 points. On January 14, 1994, he scored a career high 29 points as a member of the Clippers versus the Boston Celtics.

National team career
Ellis was a member of the senior Team USA, that won the gold medal at the 1993 FIBA AmeriCup.

Coaching career
Ellis was a minor league coordinator/scout for the Atlanta Hawks for six seasons, before his hiring on June 23, 2008 as an assistant coach to newly hired Detroit Pistons head coach Michael Curry. From 2009 to 2012, he was a scout for the Pistons. In 2012, Ellis was named director of pro scouting for the Orlando Magic.

References

External links
Basketball-Reference.com Profile
Eurobasket.com Profile

1970 births
Living people
African-American basketball coaches
African-American basketball players
American expatriate basketball people in Greece
American expatriate basketball people in Spain
American men's basketball players
Apollon Patras B.C. players
Aris B.C. players
Basketball coaches from Georgia (U.S. state)
Basketball players from Atlanta
Denver Nuggets players
Irakleio B.C. players
Las Vegas Silver Bandits players
Liga ACB players
Los Angeles Clippers players
Morehouse Maroon Tigers basketball players
Quad City Thunder players
Saski Baskonia players
Shooting guards
Undrafted National Basketball Association players
American expatriate basketball people in the Philippines
Philippine Basketball Association imports
Pop Cola Panthers players
21st-century African-American sportspeople
20th-century African-American sportspeople